André Wollscheidt (April 24, 1914 in Esch-sur-Alzette – January 31, 1995) was a Luxembourgian boxer who competed in the 1936 Summer Olympics.

In 1936 he was eliminated in the first round of the lightweight class after losing his fight to silver medalist Nikolai Stepulov of Estonia

References
André Wollscheidt's profile at the Luxembourg Olympic Association
André Wollscheidt's profile at Sports Reference.com

1914 births
1995 deaths
Sportspeople from Esch-sur-Alzette
Luxembourgian male boxers
Lightweight boxers
Olympic boxers of Luxembourg
Boxers at the 1936 Summer Olympics